Energetik Əli-Bayramlı FK was an Azerbaijani football club from Shirvan founded in 1980. They played in the Azerbaijan Top Division for only one season, 1992, before relegation to the Azerbaijan First Division. They dissolved three years later at the end of the 1994–95 season.

League and domestic cup history

References 

Football clubs in Azerbaijan
Association football clubs established in 1980
Defunct football clubs in Azerbaijan
Association football clubs disestablished in 1995